Peter Christian Zimmerman (August 17, 1887 – October 28, 1950) was an American politician from the state of Oregon.

Biography
Zimmerman was born in 1887 on a farm near Yamhill, Oregon to Christian Zimmerman and Louisa Sophia Nolte. At the age of 15, he left home and apprenticed as a blacksmith; he graduated from the Oregon Agricultural College (now Oregon State University) at the age of 22 and purchased a small farm near Yamhill in 1919.

Zimmerman ran for the Oregon State Senate in 1922, defeating incumbent W. T. Vinton in the Republican primary. He served until 1927, and was elected again in 1932, serving until 1937.

In 1934, Zimmerman ran for Governor of Oregon. Although he was defeated in the Republican primary by fellow state senator Joe E. Dunne, he was urged to run as an independent by farm groups. Zimmerman lost the general election to Democrat Charles Martin, receiving 32% of the vote and coming in second place, winning eight counties.

Zimmerman and his wife, Ethel F. Patey, had one daughter, Carolyn; she married Ben Larson. He died of throat cancer in 1950, aged 63.

References

External links
 

1887 births
1950 deaths
Oregon Independents
Oregon Republicans
Oregon state senators
Oregon State University alumni
People from Yamhill, Oregon
Deaths from throat cancer
20th-century American politicians